Owino is a surname. Notable people with the name include:

Daniel Owino Misiani (1940–2006), Tanzanian musician
David Owino (born 1988), Kenyan footballer 
David Owino (footballer, born 1998), Kenyan footballer 
George Owino (born 1981), Kenyan footballer
Janet Owino  (born 1985), Kenyan rugby sevens player
Joseph Owino, Ugandan entrepreneur 
Joseph Owino (footballer) (born 1984), Ugandan footballer
Josephine Owino (born 1983), Kenyan professional basketball player
Julius Owino (born 1976),  Kenyan footballer 
Lawrence Owino (born 1982), Kenyan footballer